Jugaadi Dot Com (2015) is a Punjabi romantic comedy film directed by Anil Vij, starring Nachhatar Gill, Feroz Khan, Sarb Chawla, Rana Ranbir, Mansi Sharma, Komya Virk, Megha Sharma, Ghulle Shah, Bhotu Shah, Parkash Gaadu, Dr.Ranjit Riyaz, Cheeku, Babbu Gill, Honey Shergill, Vishv Dipak Trikha and Gajendra Phogat.

Cast
 Ehtisham Ahmed
 Nachhatar Gill
 Feroz Khan
 Sarb Chawla
 Rana Ranbir
 Mansi Sharma
 Komya Virk
 Megha Sharma
Ghulle Shah
Bhotu Shah
Parkash Gaadu
Dr.Ranjit Riyaz
Cheeku
Babbu Gill
Honey Shergill
Vishv Dipak Trikha
Gajendra Phogat
Ashish Rana

References

External links
 Facebook page

2015 films
Punjabi-language Indian films
2010s Punjabi-language films